Schexnayder is a German surname, probably deriving from an occupational name for a maker of jackets and jerkins. The family name came to Louisiana with immigrant families and is well established there and has spread to other states.

United States
The first Schexnayder to settle in Louisiana, Henry Albert Schexnayder, arrived in the 1720s and settled in what was called the "German Coast" (now St. Charles Parish). Hanno Deiler lists 27 spellings of the Schexnayder surname found in official documents.

Notable individuals with the surname include:

Anthony Schexnayder (born 1968), 4-year Letterman for UCLA varsity football team
Calvin Schexnayder (born 1969), American arena football player
Charlotte Tillar Schexnayder (1923–2020), American newspaper editor and politician
Clay Schexnayder (born 1969), Louisiana politician
Maurice Schexnayder (1895–1981), American Roman Catholic prelate

Arrival in the U.S.A. from Europe
Three Schexnayder families departed Europe bound for Louisiana in the early 18th century, but only two families left documents showing they actually arrived in Louisiana.

A Scheckschneider family, consisting of Hans Rhinhart, Catherine, and their two sons left L’Orient, France aboard the La Garonne in January 1721. Several on board were taken ill, and their son Jacob was one of the sixteen who were left in Brest, France because they were too ill for the voyage. The name of the second son was not recorded, and no record of this family has been found in Louisiana. An undated- likely post-1732- list of inhabitants of the German Coast (St Charles Parish) lists a Henry Albert Scheckschneider as holding 4 arpents on the west bank.

The New Orleans Catholic Church has records for two Schexnayder families:

1. A record of the marriage on 26 June 1742 of Hanz Georg Schscchneider, son of Hanz Schscchneider and Anne Marie Hessin, and Catherine Antonia.

2. Records of the baptisms of the five children of Albert Schscchneider and Marie Magdelaine Wich are in the New Orleans Catholic Church records: Catherinne, Jean George, Jean Henry and Marie Lucie and Marie Josephe.

Louisiana heritage
Schexnayder House at 1681 Pelican Drive in Iberville Parish was listed on the National Register of Historic Places in 1989.

Olide P. Schexnayder (1871 - 1944) was a photographer in Edgard, Louisiana until he switched careers and became an optician. The Louisiana State Museum has several of his photographs in their collection.

There is a Schexnayder's Supermarket in Vacherie, Louisiana. Schexnayder Meats is a meat purveyor in St. Charles Parish.

References

Surnames